Callosciurus is a genus of squirrels collectively referred to as the "beautiful squirrels". They are found mainly in Southeast Asia, though a few species also occur in Nepal, northeastern India, Bangladesh and southern China. Several of the species have settled on islands. In total, the genus contains 15 species and numerous varieties and subspecies. The genera Glyphotes, Rubrisciurus, and Tamiops have sometimes been included in Callosciurus.

Species 
There are approximately 15 species in this genus, and over 60 subspecies. Most are rather dull olive-brown to gray and several have a pale and dark stripe on their side, however a few are very colorful. The Pallas's squirrel may have an unremarkable olive-gray back, while its belly is often –but not always– bright red. The "typical" subspecies of Prevost's squirrels have black backs, white sides, and red-brown undersides. The Finlayson's squirrel occurs in numerous varieties, three of which are overall red-brown, overall black, or pure white.

Most squirrels in Callosciurus live in tropical rain forests, but some individuals live in parks and gardens in cities. In the trees, they build their nests out of plant material. They are solitary, and give birth to one to five young. Their food consists of nuts, fruits, and seeds, and also of insects and bird eggs.

References 

 Ronald M. Nowak: Walker's Mammals of the World. Johns Hopkins University Press, 1999 
Ecology Asia page with photos and description.
Wildlife Singapore Photos and description
Ecology Asia Photos and description

External links

 Squirrels of Southeast Asia
 Photo gallery showing some of the variations of the Gray-bellied Squirrel
 Photo gallery showing some of the variations of Finlayson's Squirrel
 Profile at ecologyasia.com
 Profile at wildsingapore.per.sg

 
Rodent genera
Articles containing video clips
Taxa named by John Edward Gray

nl:Prevosts klapperrat